Gail Davis (born Betty Jeanne Grayson; October 5, 1925 – March 15, 1997) was an American actress and singer, best known for her starring role as Annie Oakley in the 1950s television series Annie Oakley.

Life and career

Early years
The daughter of a small-town physician, Davis was born in Little Rock, Arkansas, but was raised in McGehee, Arkansas until her family moved to Little Rock.

She had been singing and dancing since childhood. After graduating from Little Rock High School, she studied at the Harcum Junior College for Girls in Bryn Mawr, Pennsylvania, and then completed her education at the University of Texas at Austin. She had a younger sister, Shirley Ann Grayson (August 26, 1937 – February 23, 1971).

Film
Betty Jeanne and her husband, Bob Davis, moved to Hollywood to pursue a film career. She told an interviewer how she acquired her professional acting name. "I went under contract to MGM around 1946. They told me 'we can't have a Betty Davis, because of Bette Davis, and we can't have a Betty Grayson because of Kathryn Grayson'.... Then a guy in the casting department said 'how about Gail Davis?' So that's where it came from."

In 1947, she made her motion picture debut in a comedy short film. She then appeared in minor roles in another four films, the first being The Romance of Rosy Ridge, then landed a supporting role to that of star Roy Rogers in the 1948 The Far Frontier. From 1948 to 53, Davis appeared in 32 feature films, all but three of which were in the Western genre. Twenty of the Western films were with Gene Autry, produced by his company, Gene Autry Productions, released and distributed by Columbia Pictures,

Television

In 1950, Davis began to guest star in television Westerns, notably in The Cisco Kid, in which she appeared six times in two roles, including that of a niece whose uncle is trying to stop her pending marriage to a gangster. She guest-starred in 1950s episodes titled "Buried Treasure," "Friend in Need" and "Spanish Gold" of The Lone Ranger and twice each on The Range Rider, The Adventures of Kit Carson and Death Valley Days. Beginning in September 1950, through September 1954, she appeared in 15 episodes of The Gene Autry Show, sponsored by Wrigley's Doublemint gum.

Gail Davis was the answer to a long-held dream of Autry's—providing Western programming with a star to whom girls could relate. He said: "Little boys have had their idols ... from the beginning of the picture business.... Why not give the girls a Western star of their own?" Davis became that star, but on television rather than in movies, as Autry originally envisioned.

Between 1954 and 1957, Davis starred in the Annie Oakley series which ran for 81 episodes. An adroit horseback rider, Davis also toured North America in Gene Autry's traveling rodeo. She went on to manage other celebrities. In 1961, she made a guest appearance on The Andy Griffith Show (season 2, episode 8, titled "The Perfect Female") as Thelma Lou's cousin.

She believed her success as Annie Oakley undermined other opportunities she might have had for other roles in the future. In 1982, she told a reporter "I tried to find other acting work, but I was so identified as Annie Oakley that directors would say, 'Gail, I'd like to hire you, but you're going to have to wait a few years, dye your hair and cut off your pigtails.' Directors just couldn't envision me in a sexy part or playing a heavy. I was always going to be Annie Oakley. So, as they say, I retired."

Recording
While Annie Oakley was popular on television, Davis made some recordings for Columbia and RCA Victor. Some were targeted toward children, and others were aimed at adults. However, Bob Leszczak wrote in his book, From Small Screen to Vinyl: A Guide to Television Stars Who Made Records, 1950-2000, "Even with two different musical avenues, none of the records caught on with the public."

Later years
Davis and her third husband, Carl Edward Guerriero, retired to the San Fernando Valley. During her retirement Davis made guest appearances at western memorabilia shows and film festivals. Her last public appearance was in 1994, when she received the Golden Boot award from the Motion Picture and Television Fund.

Family
While at the University of Texas at Austin in 1945, she met and married her first husband, Bob Davis, with whom she had a daughter, Terrie. Their marriage ended in divorce in 1952. During her tenure on Annie Oakley, she had an affair with Gene Autry. On June 25, 1959, she married Richard Pierce, a recording executive, in Las Vegas, Nevada.

Death
Davis, then a widow, died of cancer in Los Angeles at age 71. She is interred there in Forest Lawn Memorial Park in Hollywood Hills.

Honors
For her contribution to the television industry, Gail Davis has a star on the Hollywood Walk of Fame at 6385 Hollywood Blvd. In 2004, she was inducted posthumously into the National Cowgirl Museum and Hall of Fame in Fort Worth, Texas. Davis' exhibit at the Cowgirl Hall of Fame recalls her impact on young girls through the Annie Oakley series:"Back then I knew the show was having a positive impact, especially on little girls. It wasn't until years later that I realized just how much. Little girls had turned into influential women, thanking my portrayal of Annie for showing them the way."

Selected filmography

 The Romance of Rosy Ridge (1947) - Baggett Daughter (uncredited)
 The Judge Steps Out (1948) - Young Mother with Baby Carriage (uncredited)
 If You Knew Susie (1948) - Ms. Gail (uncredited)
 They Live by Night (1948) - Girl at Parking Lot (uncredited)
 The Far Frontier (1948) - Susan Hathaway
 Death Valley Gunfighter (1949) - Trudy Clark
 Frontier Investigator (1949) - Janet Adams
 Law of the Golden West (1949) - Ann Calvert
 Brand of Fear (1949) - Anne Lamont
 South of Death Valley (1949) - Molly Tavish
 Sons of New Mexico (1949) - Eileen MacDonald
 Trail of the Rustlers (1950) - Mary Ellen Hyland
 West of Wyoming (1950) - Jennifer Draper
 Six Gun Mesa (1950) - Lynne Gregory
 Cow Town (1950) - Ginger Kirby
 Indian Territory (1950) - Melody Colton
 Operation Pacific (1951) - Minor Role (uncredited)
 Texans Never Cry (1951) - Nancy Carter
 Whirlwind (1951) - Elaine Lassiter
 Silver Canyon (1951) - Dell Middler
 Take Care of My Little Girl (1951) - Thelma (uncredited)
 Yukon Manhunt (1951) - Jane Kenmore
 Flying Leathernecks (1951) - Virginia Blithe (uncredited)
 Two Tickets to Broadway (1951) - Showgirl in Deli (uncredited)
 Valley of Fire (1951) - Laurie
 Overland Telegraph (1951) - Terry Muldoon
 The Old West (1952) - Arlie Williams
 Wagon Team (1952) - Connie Weldon
 Blue Canadian Rockies (1952) - Sandra Higbee
 Winning of the West (1953) - Ann Randolph
 On Top of Old Smoky (1953) - Jen Larrabee
 Goldtown Ghost Riders (1953) - Cathy Wheeler
 Pack Train (1953) - Jennifer Coleman
 Alias Jesse James (1959) - Annie Oakley (uncredited)

Selected television

References

External links

 Encyclopedia of Arkansas History & Culture web article, encyclopediaofarkansas.net
 The Colt Revolver in the American West—Gail Davis' Single Action Army, theautry.org
 "Winsome Annie Oakley", a feature about Gail Davis, Radio and Television Mirror September 1955
 "Golden Girl", a feature about Davis, Radio and Television Mirror, January 1957

1925 births
1997 deaths
20th-century American actresses
American film actresses
American television actresses
Western (genre) television actors
Metro-Goldwyn-Mayer contract players
Burials at Forest Lawn Memorial Park (Hollywood Hills)
Deaths from cancer in California
Little Rock Central High School alumni
People from Desha County, Arkansas
Actresses from Little Rock, Arkansas
RCA Victor artists
Moody College of Communication alumni
Cowgirl Hall of Fame inductees